The 2007 Legg Mason Tennis Classic was the thirty-eighth edition of the Legg Mason Tennis Classic and it took place from July 30 - August 6, 2007.

Seeds

Draw

Finals

Earlier rounds

Section 1

Section 2

Section 3

Section 4

External links
 Singles draw
 Qualifying draw

Legg Mason Tennis Classic - Singles